Brumbaugh is a surname. Notable people with the surname include:

Carl Brumbaugh (1906–1969), American football quarterback
Clement L. Brumbaugh (1863–1921), U.S. Representative from Ohio
Cliff Brumbaugh (born 1974), American baseball player
David Brumbaugh (1960–2017), American politician
D. Emmert Brumbaugh (1894–1977), Republican member of the U.S. House of Representatives from Pennsylvania
John Brombaugh (born 1937), American pipe organ builder
Martin Grove Brumbaugh (1862–1930), Pennsylvania's 25th Governor, a Republican

See also 
 Samuel Kinsey (1832–1883), son of Elizabeth Brumbaugh (1809–1860)

External links
Gaius Marcus Brumbaugh (1862–1952), M.S., M.D., author of "Genealogy of the Brumbach Families" (1913)
Genealogy of the Brumbach Families, 1913 by Gaius Marcus Brumbaugh; published by Frederick H. Hitchcock, Genealogical Publisher, New York, NY